The men's individual compound open archery discipline at the 2020 Summer Paralympics will be contested from 27 to 31 August.

In the ranking rounds each archer shoots 72 arrows, and is seeded according to score. In the knock-out stages each archer shoots three arrows per set against an opponent, the scores being aggregated. Losing semifinalists compete in a bronze medal match. As the field contained 36 archers, the eight lowest ranked archers in the ranking round, will play a preliminary match to decide the last of the round 32 places..

Ranking round
The ranking round of the men's individual compound open event was held on 27 August.

Elimination rounds
The elimination round takes place between 28 to 31 August 2021.

Section 1

Section 2

Section 3

Section 4

Finals

References

Men's individual compound open